Einertson is a surname. Notable people with the surname include:

Darrell Einertson (born 1972), American baseball player
Norris L. Einertson (born 1930), United States Army general